Alpín mac Echdach was a supposed king of Dál Riata, an ancient kingdom that included parts of Ireland and Scotland.

Cináed and Alpín are the names of Pictish kings in the 8th century: the brothers Ciniod and Elphin who ruled from 763 to 780.

Weir states that Alpín succeeded his father Eochaid IV as King 'of Scotland' (Dál Riata), and also became King of Kintyre in March/August 834, thus establishing his power over a wide area of Scotland.

Parentage and death 
The Chronicle of the Scottish historian John of Fordun records the succession of "Alpin the son of Achay" in 831, his reign of three years, and his defeat by the Picts "20 July". The 12th century Cronica Regum Scottorum lists "Alpin filius Eochal venenosi iii, Kynedus filius Alpini primus rex Scottorum xvi…" as kings, dated to the 9th century. Alpín's parentage is not stated in any of the earlier chronicles.

Alpín's mother was the sister and heiress of Causantín mac Fergusa, King of the Picts. Alpín married a 'Scottish Princess', and fathered two sons. 

Alpín is chiefly remembered for his fatal war with the Picts, who had seized upon and arrogated the Kingdom. Alpín resolved to remove the king, and met him with his forces near a village of Angus, where the fight was maintained with great obstinacy, till the Pictish king was slain, whereby the Scots got the victory. However, a new king of "high descent and noble achievements" (possibly Drest) was elected king of the Picts, and turned the scale, and at Galloway defeated and took King Alpín, anno 834, and put him with many of his nobles to death. It is said that Alpín's head was fastened to a pole, and carried about the Pictish army, and at last set up for spectacle in Abernethy, their chief town, which was afterwards severely revenged by the Scots, who called the place where he was slain Bas Alpin.

Alpín died on 20 July or in August 834 when he was either killed whilst fighting the Picts in Galloway or beheaded after the battle. His place of burial is not recorded. He was succeeded by his son Kenneth MacAlpin.

References

Kings of Dál Riata
Medieval Gaels from Scotland